is a JR West Geibi Line station located in Ibara, Shiraki-chō, Asakita-ku, Hiroshima, Hiroshima Prefecture, Japan. The "Shiwa" in the name derives from the nearby Shiwa-chō, Higashihiroshima, despite there being no shuttle bus or other connection between the two locations. This station should not be confused with other stations of similar-sounding name on the Geibi Line: Shimowachi, Shiomachi, and Shiwachi. Even though Shiwaguchi Station is an express stop station, the Miyoshi Liner does not stop here due to lack of passengers using the station.

History
1915-04-28: Shiwaguchi Station opens
1987-04-01: Japan National Railways is privatized, and Shiwaguchi Station becomes a JR West station

Station building and platforms
Shiwaguchi Station features one raised island platform, capable of handling two lines simultaneously. The station building is a prominent one-story concrete building which includes a Green Window.

Environs
Two convenience stores are located directly across from the station. The Shiwaguchi Station Bus Stop is located near the station.
Takaminami Post Office
Shimizu Clinic
Hiroshima Municipal Offices, Shiraki Branch
Hiroshima Municipal Shiraki Junior High School
Hiroshima Municipal Takaminami Elementary School
Hiroshima Municipal Shiraki High School
Misasa River
Hiyama

Highway access
 Hiroshima Prefectural Route 37 (Hiroshima-Miyoshi Route)

Connecting lines
All lines are JR West lines. 
Geibi Line
Miyoshi Express
Mukaihara Station — Shiwaguchi Station — Shimofukawa Station
Commuter Liner/Local
Ibaraichi Station — Shiwaguchi Station — Kamimita Station

External links
 JR West

Railway stations in Hiroshima Prefecture
Geibi Line
Stations of West Japan Railway Company in Hiroshima city
Railway stations in Japan opened in 1915